A telegram is a written or printed telegraph message that is directly delivered to the recipient by a messenger.

Telegram or Telegramme may also refer to:

Music
 Telegram (album), a 1996 album by Björk
 Telegram (EP), a 2004 extended-play (EP) release by Kate Miller-Heidke
 "Telegram" (song), a song by Silver Convention, representing Germany at the 1977 Eurovision Song Contest
 "Telegram", a 1976 song by Nazareth on the album Close Enough for Rock 'n' Roll

Newspapers
 The Telegram, a newspaper in St. John's, Newfoundland, Canada
 The Telegram (Herkimer), a newspaper in Herkimer, New York, US
 The Daily Telegram, a newspaper in Adrian, Michigan, US
 Telegram & Gazette, a newspaper in Worcester, Massachusetts, US, known locally as The Telegram
 Le Télégramme, a newspaper in Morlaix, Finistère, France
 Toronto Telegram, a newspaper published from 1876 to 1971 in Ontario, Canada
 Telegram Corporation, a media outlet created under a joint venture between the Toronto Telegram and the Eaton family
 Winnipeg Telegram, a newspaper published from 1898 to 1920 in Manitoba, Canada

Other uses
 Telegram (software), an instant messenger application
 "The Telegram" (short story), a story by Ian Crichton Smith
 Telegram Building, in Portland, Oregon, US
 Telegram, a Soviet 1971 film featuring Yuri Nikulin

See also
 Telegram style, the style of writing adopted for use in telegrams
 Telegram messenger, person who delivers a telegram
 Singing telegram, any message delivered as a song
 International Telegram (disambiguation)